Metareva paulina is a moth of the subfamily Arctiinae. It was described by Paul Dognin in 1923. It is found in Brazil.

References

 Natural History Museum Lepidoptera generic names catalog

Lithosiini